The 1st Mountain Division (1. Gebirgsdivision) was a West German mountain infantry formation. It was part of the II Corps of the Bundeswehr. In the wake of military restructuring brought about by the end of the Cold War, the 1st Mountain Division was disbanded in 2001.

The division was constituted in November 1956 as part of the II Corps of the Bundeswehr. As initially formed, it had two brigade-sized battle-groups, "A8" and "B8" (despite its numerical designation, the division was considered the eighth division of the Bundeswehr). In 1959, the battle-groups were retitled the 22nd and 23rd Mountain Brigades, and the division also took command over the 24th Panzer Brigade. In 1966, the 24th Panzer Brigade was transformed into the 24th Panzergrenadier Brigade. This structure remained stable until 1981, when the 24th Brigade once again became a Panzer brigade and the 22nd Mountain Brigade was transformed into a Panzergrenadier brigade, leaving only a third of the division's troops as mountain infantry. The 56th Local Defense Brigade was also subordinated to the division. Division headquarters was located at Garmisch-Partenkirchen.

In 1989, division equipment included Bo-105 helicopters, Leopard I tanks, Gepard SP anti-aircraft guns, Fliegerfaust 1 ManPADS, M110 203mm SP howitzers, M109G 155mm SP howitzers, LARS and MARS multiple rocket launch systems, Jaguar SP ATGMs, and Marder IFVs.

With the end of the Cold War, the 22nd Panzergrenadier Brigade was disbanded in 1992. This was followed by the inactivation of the 24th Panzer Brigade in 1994. The division was then merged with Military Readiness Command VI with the 23rd Mountain Brigade, 36th Panzer Brigade, and the 60th Engineer Training Brigade as subordinated components. In 1994 the Wehrbereichskommando VI / 1. Gebirgsdivision (WBK IV/1. GebDiv) headquarters moved into Bayern-Kaserne, Munich.

After 1993, elements of the division saw international service in Somalia, Macedonia, Albania, Kosovo, and Bosnia.

On 30 September 2001 the 1st Mountain Division was disbanded.

Commanders

References

 O. W. Dragoner, Die Bundeswehr 1989 Volume 2.1, available here
 John Keegan, World Armies, New York: Facts on File, 1979, .

Divisions of the Bundeswehr
Mountain infantry divisions
Mountain units and formations of Germany
Military units and formations established in 1956
Military units and formations disestablished in 2001
1956 establishments in West Germany
2001 disestablishments in Germany